Vuneny are an experimental band, formed in 2003 as "electro-acoustic" project. Continuously experimenting with the sound, Vuneny perform and implement music collaborating 
with different artists and music forms, metamorphosing itself into dynamic "work in progress" constantly upgrade and disperse.

Discography
 Play that Silence – Buybook (BiH), 2004, Zvuk Mochvare (HR), 2004
 V2 – Moonlee Records (SLO, HR), Buybook (BiH), 2006
 "Whatever Singularity" – Jarring Effects (FR), 2009

Projects
 Original live soundtrack – Le Revelateur, Philippe Garrel (1968.), 2003
 Movement for airports transistor remixes – Remix of Ultra-red (USA), 2004
 Cine-concert – music for silent movie Paris Qui Dort (by René Clair, 1925.), 2005
 Kompozicije – nine musical pieces for quotes by Ivo Andrić, 2006
 Individual Utopias by Lala Raščić – music by Vuneny, 2008

External links
 • myspace

Musicians from Mostar
Experimental musical groups
Bosnia and Herzegovina rock music groups
Musical groups established in 2003
Post-rock groups
2003 establishments in Bosnia and Herzegovina